In set theory, a mathematical discipline, the Jensen hierarchy or J-hierarchy is a modification of Gödel's constructible hierarchy, L, that circumvents certain technical difficulties that exist in the constructible hierarchy.  The J-Hierarchy figures prominently in fine structure theory, a field pioneered by Ronald Jensen, for whom the Jensen hierarchy is named.

Definition
As in the definition of L, let Def(X) be the collection of sets definable with parameters over X:

 

The constructible hierarchy,  is defined by transfinite recursion.  In particular, at successor ordinals, .

However,  does have the desirable property of being closed under Σ0 separation.

Jensen's modification of the L hierarchy retains this property and the slightly weaker condition that , but is also closed under pairing.

Like ,  is defined recursively. Then set  and finally, .

Properties
Each sublevel Jα, n is transitive and contains all ordinals less than or equal to αω + n. The sequence of sublevels is strictly ⊆-increasing in n, since a Σm predicate is also Σn for any n > m. The levels Jα will thus be transitive and strictly ⊆-increasing as well, and are also closed under pairing, -comprehension and transitive closure. Moreover, they have the property that

 

as desired. (Or a bit more generally, .)

The levels and sublevels are themselves Σ1 uniformly definable (i.e. the definition of Jα, n in Jβ does not depend on β), and have a uniform Σ1 well-ordering. Also, the levels of the Jensen hierarchy satisfy a condensation lemma much like the levels of Gödel's original hierarchy.

Rudimentary functions

A rudimentary function is a Vn→V function (i.e. a finitary function accepting sets as arguments) that can be obtained from the following operations:
F(x1, x2, ...) = xi is rudimentary (see projection function)
F(x1, x2, ...) = {xi, xj} is rudimentary
F(x1, x2, ...) = xi − xj is rudimentary
Any composition of rudimentary functions is rudimentary
∪z∈yG(z, x1, x2, ...) is rudimentary, where G is a rudimentary function

For any set M let rud(M) be the smallest set containing M∪{M} closed under the rudimentary functions. Then the Jensen hierarchy satisfies Jα+1 = rud(Jα).

References

  Sy Friedman (2000) Fine Structure and Class Forcing, Walter de Gruyter,  

Constructible universe